Fabrizio Crestani (born 17 December 1987) is an Italian racing driver.

Career 
Having competed in karts until 2005, Crestani moved up to the Formula Junior 1600 Italia championship, finishing in 4th place in the championship, driving for PSR Motorsport. Crestani had one win and finished behind Pasquale Di Sabatino, Mihai Marinescu and Jaime Alguersuari in the championship. He also made his debut in the Italian Formula Three Championship for Corbetta Competizioni at the final round at the Misano World Circuit. Having qualified 7th for both races, Fabrizio recorded a sixth and a seventh from the two races, allowing him to finish 13th in the championship.

Crestani moved up full-time to Italian F3 for 2006, continuing with Corbetta Competizioni. Over the course of the season, he recorded one pole position at Vallelunga, and five podiums (four of which being second places) on his way to fifth in the championship. He also made an appearance in the British Formula 3 Championship when the series visited Mugello. Driving in the Invitational Class, he finished both races outside of the points recording a 15th and a 14th with lap times matching the National Class runners.

A third season of Italian F3 followed, again with Corbetta. Having recorded two more pole positions at Misano, Crestani finally recorded his first wins in the championship at Mugello, leading home 2008 champion Mirko Bortolotti in both races. A third win would follow later in the year at Vallelunga, but Crestani could not improve on his championship position from 2006 by again finishing fifth, 41 points behind champion Paolo Maria Nocera.

Crestani would not return to the series for 2008, instead moving to the Euroseries 3000 championship for GP Racing. Again, a fifth place championship position was the net result of the season including wins at Mugello, and a double at the Magione season finale. He finished 8th in the counterpart Italian series, which ran at the same time as the Euro series, at four of the first five rounds. He also forayed into the International Formula Master series, racing at Valencia, Pau and Brno for Euronova Racing. His best finish was first in the race at Pau – holding off champion Chris van der Drift by 0.058 seconds, giving him a total of 0.5 points in the championship.

After Tiago Monteiro acquired the former BCN Competición team and renamed it as Ocean Racing Technology, Monteiro replaced both drivers from round one (Hiroki Yoshimoto and Luca Filippi), hiring Yelmer Buurman and Crestani to be the drivers to replace them from round two of the 2008–09 GP2 Asia Series season onwards. He scored no points and finished 28th in the championship. He resumed his Euroseries career with the TP Formula team, although he then switched to the Emmebi Motorsport outfit for the final round of the championship. He took six podium finishes, a pole position and a fastest lap from the 13 races to finish fourth in the championship and fifth in the concurrent Italian F3000 championship.

Crestani had a fragmented 2010, competing four races in Auto GP for the DAMS and Trident teams, and six races for David Price Racing in the main GP2 Series after replacing Giacomo Ricci in the team. Due to lack of sponsorship, Fabrizio Crestani then undertook a full 2011 season in Auto GP with the Lazarus team alongside compatriot Fabio Onidi; he finished fourth in the championship.

Crestani remained with Lazarus as the team made its GP2 Series début in 2012, and was partnered by Giancarlo Serenelli.

Racing record

Career summary

Complete GP2 Series results 
(key) (Races in bold indicate pole position) (Races in italics indicate fastest lap)

Complete GP2 Asia Series results 
(key) (Bold indicates pole position, * indicates fastest lap)

Complete Auto GP results 
(key) (Races in bold indicate pole position) (Races in italics indicate fastest lap)

Complete Blancpain GT Series Sprint Cup results

Complete European Le Mans Series results
(key) (Races in bold indicate pole position; results in italics indicate fastest lap)

References

External links 
 

1987 births
Living people
Italian racing drivers
British Formula Three Championship drivers
Italian Formula Three Championship drivers
Auto GP drivers
International Formula Master drivers
GP2 Asia Series drivers
GP2 Series drivers
International GT Open drivers
Italian Formula Renault 1.6 drivers
European Le Mans Series drivers
Blancpain Endurance Series drivers
Euronova Racing drivers
Ocean Racing Technology drivers
David Price Racing drivers
DAMS drivers
Trident Racing drivers
Team Lazarus drivers
Piquet GP drivers